Belonopsis is a genus of fungi in the family Dermateaceae. The genus contain 7 species.

Species 

Belonopsis aciculispora
Belonopsis advena
Belonopsis asteroma
Belonopsis atriella
Belonopsis bambusae
Belonopsis betulina
Belonopsis calamicola
Belonopsis coccinea
Belonopsis ebudensis
Belonopsis ericae
Belonopsis eriophila
Belonopsis eriophori
Belonopsis filispora
Belonopsis graminea
Belonopsis guestphalicum
Belonopsis ingae
Belonopsis iridis
Belonopsis juncicola
Belonopsis junciseda
Belonopsis lacustris var. caricina
Belonopsis longispora
Belonopsis mediella
Belonopsis montanensis
Belonopsis myrtillina
Belonopsis obscura
Belonopsis pallens
Belonopsis pamparum
Belonopsis purpurascens
Belonopsis retincola
Belonopsis sordidula
Belonopsis tropicalis
Belonopsis uredo
Belonopsis vaginalis

See also 

 List of Dermateaceae genera

References

External links 

 Belonopsis at Index Fungorum

Dermateaceae genera